Phenolic aldehydes are derivatives of phenol.  Phenolic aldehydes can be found in wines and cognacs.

Examples :
 Hydroxybenzaldehydes
 Protocatechuic aldehyde
 Vanillin and isovanillin
 2,3,4-trihydroxybenzaldehyde can be isolated from Antigonon leptopus.

References

Aldehydes